Jehal ke Sanadi (Bhojpuri: 𑂔𑂵𑂯𑂪 𑂍𑂵 𑂮𑂢𑂠𑂱 ; IAST: Jehal ke Sanadi) is a Bhojpuri book by Awadh Bihari Suman which was first published in 1948. It was the first collection of short stories in Bhojpuri. It contains ten short stories based on different themes.

Content

The title of ten short stories of the book are:

 Malikaar: story of the struggle two landlord brothers because of their different views.
 Aatmghat: story of a poor and unemployed man.
 Mawani Baba: story of a fake Saint who harreses his followers sexually.
 Katvaaru Dada: story showing the problems due to capitalism
 Kisan Bhagwan: depicts the plight of farmers
 Chaur ke Pooja: depicts the views of society toward a love couple.
 Gulaab
 Dafa 302: depicts the problem of poverty.
 Jehal ke Sanadi (Title of the book too): about corruption politicians.
 Kavi Kayalas: depicts the problems of capitalism.

References 

Bhojpuri-language mass media
Bhojpuri-language books
1948 short stories